Parle Products is an Indian multinational food processing company, based in Mumbai. It is best known for the biscuit brand Parle-G. In 2019, it had a 70% share of the global biscuit market. As of 2020, according to Nielsen, its Parle-G is the best-selling biscuit brand in the world. As of November 2022, Parle officially did more than 2 Billion dollar biscuit sale in single year which makes them largest biscuit seller in the world.

History 
Parle Products company was founded in 1929 in India by the Chauhan family of Vile Parle, Mumbai. The founder was Mohanlal Chauhan who hailed from Pardi near Valsad in Gujarat. He moved to Mumbai for making a living and at first, his business was tailoring. However, it was not profitable, and so he moved into the food business by selling snacks. The bakery snacks of English people was more profitable, so Mohanlal moved into that sector with the help of Parsi contacts. He ran a bakery making bread, buns, rusks, scones, Nankhatai, turnovers, etc. He was blessed with five sons - Maneklal, Pitambar, Narottam, Kantilal and Jayantilal. The five brothers worked together amicable under their father.

Parle began manufacturing biscuits in 1939, with a license to supply their biscuits only and only to the British Army. In 1947, when India became independent, the company launched an ad campaign showcasing its Glucose biscuits as an Indian alternative to the British biscuits. The Parle brand became well known in India following the success of products such as the Parle-G biscuits. Much later, in 1977, the Morarji Desai government expelled Coca Cola from India (George Fernandes was the champion of this move). The family saw an opportunity here and opened their own cold drinks business, which flourished because there was no competition. It minted money from selling cold beverages like Gold Spot, Thums Up and Frooti, all of which became household names.

The original Parle company was split into three separate companies owned by the different factions of the original Chauhan family, with a majority of it owned by Parle Agro products: Actually the separation was only that Jayantilal separated himself from his four older brothers. The reason was mainly because Jayantilal had a lifestyle different from his four older brothers. The four older brothers got the biscuits (confectionary) business as their share, and even to this day, they are all together with no further separation. Jayantilal took the beverages section as his share. This section was further divided between his two sons. The three companies today are as follows:
 Parle Products (1950s), led by Vijay, Sharad and Raj Chauhan (owner of the brands such as Parle-G, 20-20, Magix, Milkshakti, Melody, Mango Bite, Poppins, Londonderry, Kismi Toffee Bar, Monaco and KrackJack).
 Parle Agro (1960s), led by Prakash Jayantilal Chauhan (elder son of Jayantilal Chauhan). Company is run by his daughters Schauna, Alisha and Nadia (owner of the brands such as Frooti and Appy).
Parle Bisleri (1970s), led by Ramesh Jayantilal Chauhan, younger son of Jayantilal. He runs it with his wife Zainab Chauhan and their daughter Jayanti Chauhan.

All three companies continue to use the family trademark name "Parle". The original Parle group was amicably segregated into three non-competing businesses. But a dispute over the use of "Parle" brand arose when Parle Agro diversified into the confectionery business, thus becoming a competitor to Parle Products. In February 2008, Parle Products sued Parle Agro for using the brand Parle for competing confectionery products. Later, Parle Agro launched its confectionery products under a new design which did not include the Parle brand name. In 2009, the Bombay High Court ruled that Parle Agro can sell its confectionery brands under the brand name "Parle" or "Parle Confi" on condition that it clearly specifies that its products belong to a separate company which has no relationship with Parle Products.

Infrastructure 
Apart from the original factory in Mumbai, Parle has manufacturing facilities at Kanpur (Uttar Pradesh), Neemrana (Rajasthan), Bengaluru (Karnataka), Hyderabad (Telangana), Kutch (Gujarat), Khopoli (Maharashtra), Indore (Madhya Pradesh), Pantnagar (Uttarakhand), Sitarganj (Uttarakhand), Bahadurgarh (Haryana), and Muzaffarpur (Bihar). The plants at Bahadurgarh and Muzaffarpur are some of the largest manufacturing plants of Parle in India. It deploys large-scale automation for manufacturing of quality biscuits. It also has several manufacturing units on contract.

References

External links

Manufacturing companies based in Mumbai
Food and drink companies based in Mumbai
Food and drink companies established in 1929
1929 establishments in India
Indian brands